The 1899–1900 Ottawa Hockey Club season was the club's 15th season of play. Ottawa placed third in the league.

Team business 
Hod Stuart was named captain for the season. Harvey Pulford returned to the club.

Season

Highlights

Final standing

Schedule and results 

‡ defaulted to Shamrocks

Player statistics

Goaltending averages

Scorers

Awards and records

Transactions

Roster

See also 

 1900 CAHL season

References 

 

Ottawa Senators (original) seasons
Ottawa